Luis Gonzalez or González may refer to:

Academics
Luis González y González (1925–2003), Mexican historian
Luis A. Gonzalez (judge) (fl. 1978–2015), American judge

Arts and Entertainment
Luis "Checho" González (born 1928), Chilean folklore composer and songwriter
Luis González Palma (born 1957), Guatemalan photographer

Politicians
Luis González Bravo (1811–1871), two-time prime minister of Spain
Luis Arturo González López (1900–1965), president of Guatemala
Luis Gonzales Posada (born 1945), Peruvian politician
Luis Eduardo González (born 1945), Uruguayan political scientist, sociologist and polling specialist
Luis Ángel González Macchi (born 1947), President of Paraguay, 1999–2003

Sportspeople

Association football
Lucho González (born 1981), Argentine football midfielder
Luis Gonzalez (soccer, born 1989), American soccer forward
Luis González (Bolivian footballer) (born 1958), Bolivian football midfielder
Luis González (footballer, born 1972), Ecuadorian football midfielder
Luis González (footballer, born 1999), Venezuelan football goalkeeper

Baseball
Luis Gonzalez (pitcher), Dominican baseball pitcher
Luis González (Cuban League pitcher) (1884–?), Cuban baseball player
Luis Gonzalez (outfielder, born 1967) (born 1967), American former Major League Baseball outfielder
Luis González (outfielder, born 1995) (born 1995), Mexican Major League Baseball outfielder
Luis González (infielder) (born 1979), Venezuelan Major League Baseball utility player

Boxing
Luis González (Chilean boxer) (born 1949), Chilean boxer
Jorge Luis González (born 1964), Cuban heavyweight professional boxing contender, fl. 1990s
Luis González (Venezuelan boxer) (born 1984), Venezuelan boxer

Other sports
Luis González (swimmer) (born 1925), Colombian swimmer
Luis González (archer) (born 1945), Costa Rican archer
Luis González (skier) (born 1955), Puerto Rican freestyle skier
Luis Alberto González (born 1965), Colombian cyclist
Luis Javier González (born 1969), Spanish middle-distance runner

Other
Luis Gonzalez (television character), a character in Chiquititas

See also
 Luis Gonzales (1928–2012), Filipino actor